, also known as Oju Toshihide or Toshihide was a Japanese artist, creating work in traditional ukiyo-e prints and painting in the Western syle.

Migita was apprenticed to Tsukioka Yoshitoshi.  He also studied with Kinisawa Shimburō (1847–1877), who was an artist who had trained in Britain.

Starting in 1877, his work was published in newspapers and magazines.  His portraits of kabuki actors (yakusha-e) were well known.

His , in triptych format are considered to be important historical documents. This work documents Japan's participation in the First Sino-Japanese War and the Russo-Japanese War.

See also

 War artists

Notes

References
 Nussbaum, Louis Frédéric and Käthe Roth. (2005). Japan Encyclopedia. Cambridge: Harvard University Press. ; OCLC 48943301

Ukiyo-e artists
1862 births
1925 deaths
19th-century Japanese painters
20th-century Japanese painters
20th-century printmakers